Botsomtwe-Atwima-Kwanwoma District is a former district that was located in Ashanti Region, Ghana. Originally created as an ordinary district assembly in 1988, which was created from the former Ejisu-Juaben-Bosomtwe District Council. However on 29 February 2008, it was split off into two new districts: Botsomtwe District (capital: Kuntanase) and Atwima-Kwanwoma District (capital: Foase, later Twedie). The district assembly was located in the central part of Ashanti Region and had Kuntanase as its capital town.

Sources
 
 GhanaDistricts.com

Districts of Ashanti Region